War of the Worlds UK was a multi-promotional professional wrestling "supershow" tour jointly produced by Mexico's Consejo Mundial de Lucha Libre (CMLL), New Japan Pro-Wrestling (NJPW), the UK based Revolution Pro Wrestling (RPW), and the U.S.-based Ring of Honor (ROH).

The tour's three events took place on August 18 at the York Hall in London, August 19 at the Liverpool Olympia in Liverpool, and August 20 at the Edinburgh Corn Exchange in Edinburgh. The second night in Liverpool aired as a pay-per-view.

Production

Background
In 2014, NJPW and ROH formally forged a relationship, which saw them present the first War of the Worlds show on May 17, 2014, at the Hammerstein Ballroom in New York City, New York. The following year, War of the Worlds was held over two days at the 2300 Arena in Philadelphia, Pennsylvania and in 2016 it was expanded to a three-show tour with shows taking place in Dearborn, Michigan, Toronto, Ontario and New York City. The 2017 War of the Worlds tour was held from May 7 to 14. On May 22, ROH announced a second War of the Worlds tour, this time taking place in the United Kingdom, for which they and NJPW would be joined by Consejo Mundial de Lucha Libre (CMLL) and RPW. The three shows would take place on August 18 in London, August 19 in Liverpool and August 20 in Edinburgh.

Storylines
The War of the Worlds UK tour featured professional wrestling matches that involved different wrestlers from pre-existing scripted feuds and storylines. Wrestlers portrayed villains, heroes, or less distinguishable characters in the scripted events that built tension and culminated in a wrestling match or series of matches.

On August 9, ROH announced their sole World Championship match of the tour, which pitted defending champion and Bullet Club member Cody against Los Ingobernables de Japón member Sanada.

Results

Night 1

Night 2

Night 3

See also

Professional wrestling in the United Kingdom
Professional wrestling promotions in the United Kingdom

References

2017 in professional wrestling
Revolution Pro Wrestling
UK
August 2017 events in the United Kingdom
Consejo Mundial de Lucha Libre co-promoted shows
Professional wrestling in the United Kingdom
2017 Ring of Honor pay-per-view events
2017 in England
2017 in Scotland